Mahki is a village in Lorestan Province, Iran.

Mahki or Mahaki may also refer to:
Mahaki Amin Beyg, Kermanshah Province
Mahaki Naser, Kermanshah Province
Mahki Pol Mahi, Kermanshah Province
Mahaki dialect, a Southern Kurdish dialect

See also